Laevilacunaria bennetti is a species of sea snail, a marine gastropod mollusk in the family Littorinidae, the winkles or periwinkles.

Distribution

Description 
The maximum recorded shell length is 6 mm.

Habitat 
Minimum recorded depth is 10 m. Maximum recorded depth is 27 m.

References

 Reid, D.G. (1989a) The comparative morphology, phylogeny and evolution of the gastropod family Littorinidae. Philosophical Transactions of the Royal Society of London, Series B 324: 1–110.

Littorinidae
Gastropods described in 1916